Tumor necrosis factor ligand superfamily member 9 also known as 4-1BB ligand or 4-1BBL or CD137L is a protein that in humans is encoded by the TNFSF9 gene.

4-1BBL is a type 2 transmembrane glycoprotein receptor that is found on APCs (antigen presenting cells) and binds to 4-1BB (also known as CD137). The 4-1BB/4-1BBL complex belongs to the TNFR:TNF superfamily, which is expressed on activated T Lymphocytes.

Structure of 4-1BB/4-1BBL complex 

The 4-1BB/4-1BBL complex consists of three monomeric 4-1BBs bound to a trimeric 4-1BBL. Each 4-1BB monomer binds to two 4-1BBLs via cysteine-rich domains (CRDs). The interaction between 4-1BB and the second 4-1BBL is required to stabilize their interactions. The link with 4-1BBL is largely made up of amino acids from the dynamic loops of the CRD2 and the β sheet of CRD3 of 4-1BB, according to a detailed study of the binding between the 4-1BB and 4-1BBL interface. CRD2 amino acids (T61, Q67, and K69) interact with the AA′ loop (Y110 and G114) and the intra-H-strand loop (Q227 and Q230) of 4-1BBL to form various hydrogen bond interactions.

Application to cancer immunotherapy 
Studies on the poorly immunogenic Ag104A sarcoma and the extremely tumorigenic P815 mastocytoma provided the first systematic proof that anti-4-1BB antibodies have potent anti-tumor effects. Anti-4-1BB administration to mice with the aforementioned tumors was shown to substantially inhibit tumor growth by increasing CTL activity. In the years to come, more studies verified and legitimized the effect of 4-1BB signaling to inhibit tumor growth.

The interaction between 4-1BB and 4-1BBL provide costimulatory signals to a variety of T cells, which can be used to discover cancer immunotherapy. The 4-1BB/4-1BBL complex together with a signal provided by a T-cell receptor can provide costimulatory signals to CD4+ and CD8+ T cells in mice, leading to the activation of CD4+ and CD8+ T cells. The activation of CD8+ T cells is essential in antitumor immunity. The 4-1BB/4-1BBL complex with the help of T-cell receptor signals can co-stimulate human CD28− T cells and trigger the increase in CD28− T cells. Unlike the activation of CD8+ T cells, the proliferation of CD28− T cells can negatively affect cancer state and other diseases. Therefore, this pathway can be targeted for immunotherapy.

See also 
 CD137

References

External links